Ahmad Al-Saleh (Arabic:أحمد الصالح) (February 13, 1938 - April 11, 2015), was a Kuwaiti actor whose acting career spanned more than 54 years.

Works

Plays 
Rznamah (1970)
Saboha (1983)

Television series 
Hababah (1976)
Bo Marzoq (1992)
Al Sarayat (2000)
Lahob (2008)

Films 
Bas Ya Bahar (1972)
Al Sammt (1976)

Death 
Al-Saleh died on April 11, 2015 at a hospital in the United States. He was buried in Kuwait four days later.

References

1938 births
2015 deaths
Kuwaiti male actors
Kuwaiti male stage actors
Kuwaiti male film actors
20th-century Kuwaiti male actors
21st-century Kuwaiti male actors